The Bistra is a left tributary of the river Arieș in Romania. It discharges into the Arieș in Boncești, near Câmpeni.

References

Rivers of Romania
Rivers of Alba County